Chariton the Confessor (Greek: Χαρίτων; mid-3rd century, Iconium, Asia Minor – c. 350, Judaean desert) was a Christian saint. His remembrance day is September 28.

Life

Sources
We know about his vita from the 6th-century "Life of Chariton", written by an anonymous monk, which holds elements supported by modern archaeological excavations.

Early life
Chariton was a native of Iconium in the Byzantine province of Lycaonia. Under the reign of Emperor Aurelian (270-275) he was tortured and came close to become a martyr during a persecution against Christians. Released from prison after Aurelian's death, he regretted not having died as a martyr.

Pharan near Jerusalem
After his release in 275, during a pilgrimage to Jerusalem and other holy places, Chariton was abducted by bandits and brought to a cave in the Pharan Valley (upper Wadi Qelt). The traditional account states that his abductors died by drinking wine that was poisoned by a snake. Chariton decided to remain a hermit in the cave after this miraculous death of his abductors. There he built a church and established a monastery, the first one of the lavra type.

Douka near Jericho
Later he moved to the Mount of Temptation near Jericho, where he established the lavra of Douka on the ruins of the Hasmonean and Herodian Dok Fortress.

Souka (Old Lavra at Tekoa)

After that he moved on to establish a third monastery in the Valley of Tekoa, named the Souka and later known as the Old Lavra. The valley is a wadi later named in Arabic after him, Wadi Khureitun.

In all three locations his fame let Christians flock to learn from him, disturbing his solitude, which was the reason for him repeatedly moving on. At Souka he eventually relocated to a cave on a cliff near the centre of the lavra, known as the "Hanging Cave of Chariton" and whose remains have been discovered by Israeli archaeologist Yizhar Hirschfeld.

Legacy
The importance of Chariton lays mainly in the fact that he established by his own example the rules for monastic life in the Judaean desert, in the context of lavra-type monasteries. These rules became the main traits of monastic rule everywhere, based on asceticism and solitude: he lived in silence, only ate certain types of food and only after sundown, performed manual work, spent the night in an alternation of sleep and psalmody, prayed at fixed hours, stayed in his cell, and controlled his thoughts.

According to tradition, he was the one to compile the "Office of the Monastic Tonsure".

See also

Desert Fathers and Desert Mothers, early Christian hermits, ascetics, and monks who lived mainly in the Scetes desert of Egypt beginning around the third century AD
Euthymius the Great (377–473), founder of monasteries in Palestine and saint
Hilarion (271–371), anchorite and saint considered by some to be the founder of Palestinian monasticism
Pachomius the Great (c. 292–348), Egyptian saint generally recognized as the founder of Christian cenobitic monasticism
Paul of Thebes (c. 226/7 –  c. 341), known as "Paul, the First Hermit", who preceded both Anthony and Chariton
Theodosius the Cenobiarch (c. 423–529), monk and saint, traditionally credited with organizing the cenobitic way of life in the Judaean desert 
Sabbas the Sanctified (439–532), monk and saint, founded several monasteries in Palestine

References

Bibliography
 Leah Di Segni: The Life of Chariton, in: Ascetic Behavior in Greco-Roman Antiquity: A Sourcebook (Studies in Antiquity and Christianity), Vincent L. Wimbush, Minneapolis 1990, p. 393–421.
 Shehadeh, Raja: Palestinian Walks, pp. 136–7. Profile Books (2008),

External links
 Russian Orthodox Ecclesiastical Mission in Jerusalem: "Skete of Saint Chariton - Fara", about the rebuilt monastic site in Pharan Valley, its history and rediscovery

4th-century Christian saints
3rd-century births
4th-century deaths